The 1993–94 FR Yugoslavia Cup was the second season of the FR Yugoslavia's annual football cup. The cup defenders was Red Star Belgrade, but was defeated by FK Partizan in the semi-finals. FK Partizan went on to become the winner of the competition, after they defeated Spartak Subotica.

First round

|}
Note: Roman numerals in brackets denote the league tier the clubs participated in the 1993–94 season.

Second round

|}
Note: Roman numerals in brackets denote the league tier the clubs participated in the 1993–94 season.

Quarter-finals

|}

Semi-finals

|}

Final

First leg

Second leg

Partizan won 9–4 on aggregate.

See also
 1993–94 First League of FR Yugoslavia
 1993–94 Second League of FR Yugoslavia

References

External links
Results on RSSSF

FR Yugoslavia Cup
Cup
Yugo